Jane Garvey may refer to:

 Jane Garvey (aviation administrator), head of the U.S. Federal Aviation Administration, 1997–2002
 Jane Garvey (broadcaster) (born 1964), British radio presenter